Nigel Jerome Edwin Watson (24 September 1947 – 16 February 2019) was an English guitarist best known for his work with ex-Fleetwood Mac guitarist Peter Green.

Career
After Green left Fleetwood Mac in 1970, he worked with Watson on two solo singles, "Heavy Heart" and "Beasts of Burden", the latter being credited to both musicians. Watson also accompanied Green as conga player on a tour of the United States with Fleetwood Mac in February and March 1971. Jeremy Spencer had suddenly left the band and they asked Green to fill in and help them fulfil their tour obligations. Watson was at that time the brother-in-law of Fleetwood Mac's manager Clifford Davis.

In 1996, Watson and Green started working together again, and Watson was influential in persuading Green to return to music after he had been musically idle for several years. They formed the Peter Green Splinter Group, and released several albums over the following few years until the group split in 2004. Green was not always comfortable taking centre-stage when playing live, and Watson provided an extra focus onstage, singing as well as playing lead guitar. He also composed many songs recorded for the albums.

He died on 16 February 2019.

Discography

Singles
Peter Green – "Heavy Heart" / "No Way Out" (1970) Reprise K14082
Nigel Watson and Peter Green – "Beasts of Burden" / "Uganda Woman" (January 1972) Reprise K14141

With the Peter Green Splinter Group
Peter Green Splinter Group (1997)
The Robert Johnson Songbook (1998)
Soho Session (1999)
Destiny Road (1999)
Hot Foot Powder (2000)
Time Traders (2001)
Blues Don't Change (2001)
The Best of Peter Green Splinter Group (2002 compilation)
Reaching the Cold 100 (2003)

References

1947 births
2019 deaths
English rock singers
English blues singers
English rock guitarists
English blues guitarists
English male guitarists
English male singer-songwriters
English rock musicians
Blues singer-songwriters
Contemporary blues musicians
Electric blues musicians
Blues rock musicians
British blues (genre) musicians
Reprise Records artists
20th-century British guitarists
21st-century British guitarists
20th-century British male singers
21st-century British male singers
20th-century English singers
21st-century English singers
Peter Green Splinter Group members
Musicians from London